GMA Pictures is a film and television production company in the Philippines, established by GMA Network in 1995. Its films include Jose Rizal, Muro Ami, and Deathrow.

Filmography

History

Background
GMA tested the movie waters by co-producing films with Viva Films.  Among the movies that were co-produced were Ober Da Bakod: The Movie, Forever and Sana Dalawa ang Puso Ko.  Although not credited in the opening and closing credits of the movies, the network's logo appeared in the aforementioned movies' posters in theaters and newspaper ads.

1995–2000: Early years

In 1995, GMA launched its own film outfit as Cinemax Studios under the supervision of Jimmy Duavit and Butch Jimenez, with Run Barbi Run as its maiden movie. Later that year, Cinemax inked a co-production deal with OctoArts Films in which OctoArts would distribute the movies in theaters nationwide, while Cinemax (through its mother network, GMA) would handle publicity and promotions of the movies for TV and radio. GMA Network holds the airing rights for those movies. Films co-produced with other production companies are distributed by Cinemax.

In 1997, Cinemax began producing and distributing its own movies, beginning with Mga Bangka sa Tag-araw (later on known as Sa Pusod ng Dagat) and Indios (later on known as My Guardian Debil). At this time, it partnered with sister companies Film Experts and Optima Digital for production and post-production of its movies respectively.

In 1998, it changed its name to GMA Films after HBO's sister channel Cinemax entered the Southeast Asian market. The same year, GMA received critical and commercial success for Sa Pusod ng Dagat and José Rizal, both produced and directed by Marilou Diaz-Abaya. GMA Films also produced Muro-Ami and Deathrow, both which were entries at their respective MMFFs and also critically acclaimed.

When Felipe Gozon took over GMA Network, GMA Films was placed on hiatus for about 4 years.

2004–2009: Comeback and breakthrough
In late 2004, GMA Films made a comeback with the beginning of production for the romantic movie Let the Love Begin. It became the highest-grossing Valentine film in the Philippines when it released in February 2005.

It later released other films that also became hits in the Philippine Box-office.

In 2007, the award-winning film Ouija co-produced with Viva Films was supposed to be its first film to be released internationally. However, the scheduled overseas premieres in four U.S. cities (Las Vegas, San Francisco, Los Angeles, and San Diego) were cancelled. Only the one in New Jersey pushed through. The movie is titled Seance internationally.

In 2009, GMA Films produced the reboot of the classic komiks novel Ang Panday in partnership with Imus Productions.  Starring Ramon "Bong" Revilla Jr. in the title role, it became the official entry of GMA Films and Imus Productions for the 2009 Metro Manila Film Festival. It became the festival's top grosser and won 6 major awards, including Best Picture and Best Actor for Revilla.

2010–2012: Continued success
From then on, all films were only released nationwide while selected films had selected screenings in key points worldwide such as When I Met U, starring Richard Gutierrez and KC Concepcion had various international screenings and You to Me Are Everything, starring Marian Rivera and Dingdong Dantes had a New Jersey showing in 2010 and its recent film to be released at least within US borders was In Your Eyes, starring Claudine Barretto, Richard Gutierrez and Anne Curtis, had an international screening in notable cities such as Los Angeles and San Diego.

During the 2010 Metro Manila Film Festival, GMA Films' entry Si Agimat at si Enteng Kabisote became the top grosser. The film starred Vic Sotto and Ramon "Bong" Revilla Jr. and was a joint production with Imus Productions, M-Zet Production, Octo Arts Films and APT Entertainment.

On May 11, 2012, The Road was released to theaters in the U.S. and Canada.

2012 is the year that GMA Films has produced eight films in a year, the most it has ever done since its very start. This was part of GMA Films' resolution to produce one film per month. Even though that did not happen, they managed to produce eight films. On the same year, It made their own first venture for television was Cielo de Angelina on the morning slot.

2013–2014: Decline
In 2013, GMA Films produced only 2 feature film, Dance of the Steelbars and My Lady Boss.  Both films performed less than its previous films last year despite a star-studded cast. It distributed the Cinemalaya 2013 entry Sana Dati to theaters.

In 2014, the film outfit produced the horror-thriller Basement, the action-thriller Overtime and the 40th Metro Manila Film Festival entry Kubot: The Aswang Chronicles 2, which won 5 major awards.

2015–2016: AlDub phenomenon

With the popularity of the AlDub love team (Alden Richards and Maine Mendoza rising to phenomenal heights in 2015, GMA Films partnered with Octo Arts Films, M-Zet Productions, APT Entertainment and MEDA Productions to produce My Bebe Love: #KiligPaMore as entry to the 41st Metro Manila Film Festival.  The hottest love team was joined by Vic Sotto and Ai-Ai delas Alas, directed by Jose Javier Reyes.  The movie figured in a tight race with another MMFF entry, Beauty and the Bestie for the top spot at the box-office.  The movie eventually earned P385 million, breaking box-office records.  The said movie also earned 3 major awards, including Best Supporting Actress for Maine Mendoza.

In 2016, GMA Films partnered with APT Entertainment and M-Zet Productions for the movie Imagine You and Me, which marked the second team-up of Alden Richards and Maine Mendoza.  Shot mostly in Como and Verona in Italy, the movie was directed by Mike Tuviera.  It was also one of the only two films (the other one is the film adaptation of Angels & Demons by Dan Brown) permitted to shoot in Verona.

Upon the movie's release on July 13, 2016, the film grossed over ₱12.8 million on the first six hours of opening day and it went on to gross over ₱21.5 million at the end of the day. It was 2016's highest opening gross for a Philippine film until it was surpassed by the Kathryn Bernardo and Daniel Padilla starrer Barcelona: A Love Untold, which grossed ₱23 million according to Star Cinema.  Overall, Imagine You and Me was a big box office hit and had a successful four-week run in Philippine cinemas nationwide.

After Imagine You and Me, GMA Films took another hiatus as parent GMA Network focused on its migration to digital TV.

2019–present: Second comeback
After a 2-year hiatus, in 2019, GMA revived its film outfit as GMA Pictures. They also inked a co-production deal with Mic Test Entertainment, starting with Family History. It also co-produced the Cinemalaya 2019 entry Children of the River with Spears Films and Luna Studios.

GMA Pictures also created a new division called Backyard Productions, with Kiko en Lala as its first release.

On April 29, 2022, GMA Pictures inked a joint venture agreement with Viva Films.

GMA Records Home Video

GMA Records Home Video is the home video distribution arm of GMA Pictures. It is the exclusive home video and DVD distributor of GMA Films library as well as programs from GMA Network.

References

GMA Pictures
Philippine film studios
Entertainment companies of the Philippines
Film production companies of the Philippines
Television production companies of the Philippines
Mass media companies established in 1995
Companies based in Quezon City